
Year 1508 (MDVIII) was a leap year starting on Saturday (link will display the full calendar) of the Julian calendar.

Events 
<onlyinclude>

January–June 
 February – Maximilian I, Holy Roman Emperor, attacks the Republic of Venice.
 March 22 – Ferdinand II of Aragon appoints Florentine merchant Amerigo Vespucci to the post of Chief Navigator of Spain.

July–December 
 August – Lebna Dengel succeeds his father Na'od, as Emperor of Ethiopia. Because of his youth, his grandmother Eleni acts as regent.
 August 12 — Puerto Rico is established by Juan Ponce de León as San Juan Bautista upon arriving to Caparra (present-day Guaynabo).
 December – Michelangelo begins painting the Sistine Chapel ceiling in the Holy See of Rome, on a commission by Pope Julius II (signed May 10).
 December 10 – The League of Cambrai is formed as an alliance against the Republic of Venice, between Pope Julius II, Louis XII of France, Maximilian I, Holy Roman Emperor and Ferdinand II of Aragon.
 December 29 – Battle of Dabul: Portuguese forces, under the command of Francisco de Almeida, attack Khambhat.

Births 

 February 17 – Bernardo Salviati, Italian Catholic cardinal (d. 1568)
 April 3 – Jean Daurat, French writer and scholar (d. 1588)
 April 5 – Ercole II d'Este, Duke of Ferrara, Italian noble (d. 1559)
 April 23 – Georg Sabinus, German writer (d. 1560)
 May 8 – Charles Wriothesley, English Officer of Arms (d. 1562)
 June 8 – Primož Trubar, Slovenian Protestant reformer who lays the foundations for the Slovenian written language (d. 1586)
 June 10 – Hedwig of Münsterberg-Oels, German noble (d. 1531)
 June 13 – Alessandro Piccolomini, Italian humanist and philosopher from Siena (d. 1579)
 June 29 – Balthasar of Hanau-Münzenberg, German nobleman (d. 1534)
 September 19 – Maria Paleologa, Italian noblewoman (d. 1530)
 September 23 – Simon Sulzer, Swiss theologian (d. 1585)
 September 25 – Francisco Mendoza de Bobadilla, Spanish Catholic cardinal (d. 1566)
 November 23 – Francis, Duke of Brunswick-Lüneburg, youngest son of Henry the Middle (d. 1549)
 November 25 – Cristofano Gherardi, Italian painter (d. 1556)
 November 30 – Andrea Palladio, Italian architect (d. 1580)
 December 9 – Gemma Frisius, Dutch mathematician and cartographer (d. 1555)
 December 21 – Thomas Naogeorgus, German playwright (d. 1563)
 December 24 – Pietro Carnesecchi, Italian humanist (d. 1567)
 date unknown
 Livio Agresti, Italian painter (d. 1580)
 Matsunaga Hisahide, Japanese daimyo (d. 1577)
 Marin Držić, Croatian playwright (d. 1567)
 possible
Isabel de Josa, Catalan writer (d. 1575)
 Jane Seymour, third queen of Henry VIII of England (d. 1537)

Deaths 

 February – Robert Lauder of the Bass, governor of Berwick-on-Tweed (b. c. 1440)
 February 4 – Conrad Celtes, German humanist (b. 1459)
 February 15 – Giovanni II Bentivoglio, tyrant of Bologna (b. 1443)
 February 27 – James, Duke of Rothesay, heir to the throne of Scotland (b. 1507)
 February 28 – Philip, Elector Palatine (b. 1448)
 March 18 – Albert IV, Duke of Bavaria (b. 1447)
 March – Lourenço de Almeida, Portuguese explorer
 April 10 – Guidobaldo da Montefeltro, Italian condottiero (b. 1472)
 May 21 – Giles Daubeney, 1st Baron Daubeney (b. 1451)
 May 27 – Ludovico Sforza, Duke of Milan (b. 1452)
 June 6 – Ercole Strozzi, Italian poet (b. 1473)
 June 15 – Bernard Stewart, 4th Lord of Aubigny (b. c. 1452)
 July 28 – Robert Blackadder, Bishop of Glasgow
 July 31 – Na'od, Emperor of Ethiopia (in battle)
 September 23 – Beatrice of Naples, queen consort of Hungary (b. 1457)
 October 18 – Patrick Hepburn, 1st Earl of Bothwell, Lord High Admiral of Scotland
 October 10 – János Thurzó, Hungarian businessman (b. 1437)
 October 23 – Edmund de Ros, 10th Baron de Ros, English politician (b. 1446)
 November 25 – Ursula of Brandenburg, Duchess of Münsterberg-Oels and Countess of Glatz (b. 1450)
 December 10 – René II, Duke of Lorraine (b. 1451)
 December 16 – Henry the Younger of Stolberg, Stadtholder of Friesland (1506–1508) (b. 1467)
 December 22 – Eric II, Duke of Mecklenburg (b. 1483)
 date unknown
 Isaac Abravanel, Portuguese statesman, philosopher and theologian (b. 1437)
 Mahmud Khan (Moghul Khan), Khan of Tashkent
 Micheletto Corella, Valencian condottieri
 Damkhat Reachea, emperor of Cambodia
 Ahmad al-Wansharisi, North African Islamic jurist and theologian

References